Donnybrook Quarter is a residential district of the Old Ford area of East London. Constructed in 2006, it is a development by Peter Barber Architects. Barber cites Le Corbusier, Adolf Loos and JJP Oud as influences on the project, and said that in consultancy meetings with locals  "the residents were thinking, 'Spain! Holidays! Marbella!' I'm completely happy with that."

References

External links
Donnybrook Quarter (Peter Barber Architects)
Housing Showdown Donnybrook Quarter and Robin Hood Gardens

Housing estates in the London Borough of Tower Hamlets
Old Ford